Pterostylis riparia,  commonly known as the streamside greenhood,  is a plant in the orchid family Orchidaceae and is endemic to New South Wales. Both flowering and non-flowering plants have a rosette of dark green, fleshy leaves. Flowering plants have a single, relatively large green, white and reddish-brown flower with a deeply notched sinus between hairy lateral sepals.

Description
Pterostylis riparia, is a terrestrial,  perennial, deciduous, herb with an underground tuber. The dorsal sepal and petals are joined to form a hood called the "galea" over the column with the dorsal sepal and petals a similar length and ending in a sharp point. The sinus between the lateral sepals is flat and hairy with a deep notch in the centre. Flowering occurs in October and November.

Taxonomy and naming
Pterostylis riparia was first formally described in 2006 by David Jones from a specimen collected near Omadale Brook in the Barrington Tops National Park and the description was published in Australian Orchid Research. The specific epithet is derived from the Latin riparius meaning 'of stream banks'.

Distribution and habitat
The streamside greenhood grows on moist forest slopes and is restricted to the Barrington Tops National Park.

Conservation status
This greenhood is listed as "vulnerable" under the Australian Government Environment Protection and Biodiversity Conservation Act 1999 and the New South Wales Government Biodiversity Conservation Act 2016.

References

riparia
Endemic orchids of Australia
Orchids of New South Wales
Plants described in 2006